The Malá Pravčická Brána is a natural sandstone arch, that is about  high and  wide. It is located in Bohemian Switzerland near the red signposted main hiking route (E3 European long distance path) between Mezní Louka and Vysoká Lípa.

Its name is derived from the nearby Pravčická brána in the Winterberg area, the largest natural sandstone arch in Europe. Amongst the cave formations in Bohemian Switzerland there are a number of other Kleine Prebischtore.

References 
 Roland H. Winkelhöfer: Durch Höhlen der Böhmischen Schweiz: Höhlenführer und Katasterdokumentation. Der Höhlenforscher, Dresden 1997, 

Bohemian Switzerland
Děčín District
Natural arches
Rock formations of the Czech Republic